Rannvijay Singh was elected unopposed to the Bihar Legislative Council on 3 June 2016. He is a member of Janata Dal (United). He is a former member of Rashtriya Janata Dal. On 23 June 2020 he along with four other MLCS merged with JD(U). He was again elected as a Member of Bihar Legislative Council on MLA quota in 2022.

He was in talks of fighting the Bihar Legislative Assembly election from Barhara, but it couldn't materialize.

References

Living people
Year of birth missing (living people)
Members of the Bihar Legislative Council
Janata Dal (United) politicians